The Battle of Novgorod-Seversky was the first major battle of False Dmitry I against Boris Godunov.

Prelude 
False Dmitry I crossed the border of the Tsardom of Russia in winter of 1604 commanding a mercenary army of Polish-Lithuanian noblemen. Many residents of southern Russian lands flocked to his banner, and the fortified cities of Chernigov and Putyvl accepted him as their "rightful sovereign".

Siege of Novgorod Seversky 
Novgorod Seversky was the only city that resisted False Dmitry's troops, defended by Voivode Peter Basmanov and Nikita Trubetskoi with 1,500 men and several heavy cannon. The siege began on November 21, but two major assaults were successfully repulsed.

Battle 
Nevertheless, the army of the impostor continued to grow to about 15.000, as new towns and cities recognized his authority. To help Basmanov, Tsar Boris Godunov sent some 25.000 servicemen (probably 40.000 including armed serfs) under Prince Fyodor Mstislavsky. But False Dmitry I took the initiative and attacked the larger Russian army on December 31, 1604, on the outskirts of the city. Polish Hussars, led personally by the impostor, routed the right wing of the Russian army, put the center in a disarray, and wounded Prince Mstislavsky himself.  The Prince was saved by a counter-attack of Streltsy under Mikhail Shein, and the Russian army retreated to their fortified camp.

Aftermath 
The Tsar's army quickly recovered and defeated the usurper in the Battle of Dobrynichi in January 1605.

References 

1604 in Europe
Novhorod
Conflicts in 1604
History of Chernihiv Oblast
1604 in Russia